Blanche Willams Stubbs (1872 – 1952) was an American civil rights activist and suffragist. A prominent activist in Wilmington, Delaware, in 2019 it was announced that she was to be inducted into the Hall of Fame of Delaware Women.

Biography 
Blanche Williams was born in Wisconsin in February 1872. She was the daughter of a successful barber, and Blanche moved with her family as they relocated to Philadelphia in 1900. Possibly inspired by her father's profession and her siblings (several of whom went on to work in the medical field), Blanche attended Howard University, graduating in 1892, and later moved to Wilmington, Delaware to teach at a local high school. While in Wilmington she married Dr. J. Bacon Stubbs, a fellow Howard alumnus.

In addition to her work as a teacher, Blanche was active in her community; she assisted in founding the Equal Suffrage Study Club and the Garrett Settlement House (a black orphanage and community center), campaigned for women's suffrage in Delaware, and supported the overturning of the State of Delaware's segregation laws. She also severed as the Delaware chairwomen for the National Republican Women's Auxiliary Committee, and served as a member of the National Association of Colored Women. Blanche died in Wilmington in 1952.  

In 2019, Blanche Williams Stubbs was inducted into the Hall of Fame of Delaware Women by Delaware Governor John Carney.

References 

1872 births
1952 deaths
People from Wilmington, Delaware
Howard University alumni
American suffragists
Activists for African-American civil rights